Šípkov is a village and municipality in Bánovce nad Bebravou District in the Trenčín Region of north-western Slovakia.

History

In historical records the village was first mentioned in 1295.

Geography
The municipality lies at an altitude of 270 metres and covers an area of 11.557 km². It has a population of about 150 people.

References

External links
http://www.statistics.sk/mosmis/eng/run.html

Villages and municipalities in Bánovce nad Bebravou District